Pete International Airport is the self-titled debut studio album by American neo-psychedelia band Pete International Airport. It was released on 15 September 2010 by record label Custom Made Music.

Background 

On the making of the album, Holmström states:

I started coming up with some of the songs back in '97; I just never found the right place for them [...] Some of them didn't work with the band's views and other ones, I started another band to try to do the songs and that didn't work out. So I just ended up doing them on my own, which is something I needed to do as I was growing as a musician and a songwriter.

Reception 

The album received mixed-to-favorable reviews. Consequence of Sound called the album "a very mellow, bizarre and sure-to-be-discussed fall album", writing that "their weird brand of indie will certainly strike a chord with the crowd that has been building up decade after decade". AllMusic's review was favorable, writing that it "brings back the druggy joys of the younger Dandys [The Dandy Warhols] circa Dandys Rule OK? and Come Down".

Track listing

References

External links 

 

2010 albums
Pete International Airport albums